Callostylis is a genus of orchids. It was previously considered as a synonym of the genus Eria, but eventually it has become an accepted name. It is native to Southeast Asia from Assam and southern China to Java.

Five species are currently recognised (May 2014):

Callostylis bambusifolia (Lindl.) S.C.Chen & J.J.Wood - Yunnan, Guangxi, Assam, Bhutan, India, Myanmar, Thailand, Vietnam
Callostylis carnosissima (Ames & C.Schweinf.) J.J.Wood - Sabah
Callostylis cyrtosepala (Schltr.) Y.P.Ng & P.J.Cribb - Sumatra
Callostylis pulchella (Lindl.) S.C.Chen & Z.H.Tsi - Laos, Thailand, Malaysia, Borneo, Sulawesi, Java, Sumatra 
Callostylis rigida Blume - from Assam and southern China to Java.

References 

Eriinae
Podochileae genera